Frank J. Fleming is an American columnist, author, and satirist.

Fleming is a columnist for the New York Post and is the founder of the political humor website IMAO.us. His first book, Obama: The Greatest President in the History of Everything, was published in 2011 by HarperCollins. His second book, The Plan to Keep America Awesome, was released on September 4, 2012. His third book, Punch Your Inner Hippie, was released on November 11, 2014, and his fifth book, "Superego," was published later the same year

References

American columnists
American male non-fiction writers
Living people
Year of birth missing (living people)